Arpaderesi can refer to:

 Arpaderesi, Sur
 Arpaderesi, Taşova